Octane Twisted is a live album released by Porcupine Tree on 5 November 2012. The album contains a live performance of the band's 2009 album The Incident in its entirety recorded at the Riviera Theater in Chicago on 30 April 2010. The second CD contains other tracks also recorded in Chicago (CD 2, tracks 1–4), along with 3 songs from the band's (then) final show at Royal Albert Hall in London on 14 October 2010 (CD 2, tracks 5–7). The initial pressing also included a DVD containing a video of the Incident set.

Track listing
All songs by Steven Wilson unless noted

Personnel

Porcupine Tree
 Steven Wilson – lead vocals, guitar; mixing
 John Wesley – session guitar, backing vocals (Touring member only)
 Colin Edwin – bass
 Richard Barbieri – keyboards; synthesizer
 Gavin Harrison – drums, percussion; mixing

Production
 Eric Dorris - DVD Director
 Josh Dick – additional production
 Carl Glover – design, photography
 Claudia Hahn – photography
 Lasse Hoile – photography
 Andy Leff – management
 Steve Martin – additional production
 Diana Nitschke – photography
 Neil Warnock – additional production

Charts

References

Porcupine Tree live albums
2012 live albums
Kscope albums